Patriarch Theophilus I may refer to:

 Theophilus I of Alexandria, ruled in 385–412
 Patriarch Theophilus I of Jerusalem, ruled in 1012–1020